Uliana Kliueva (born 30 June 2002) is a Russian diver. She competed in the women's 3 metre springboard event at the 2019 World Aquatics Championships in Gwangju, South Korea. She finished in 22nd place in the preliminary round.

In 2018, she won the silver medal in the girls' 3m springboard event at the 2018 Summer Youth Olympics held in Buenos Aires, Argentina. She also competed in the mixed team event. In 2019, Kliueva and Vitaliia Koroleva won the gold medal in the women's 3 metre synchro springboard at the 2019 European Diving Championships held in Kyiv, Ukraine. Kliueva and Ruslan Ternovoi finished in 5th place in the mixed 3 m springboard synchro event. In the women's 3 metre springboard event she finished in 11th place.

In 2021, Kliueva and Vitaliia Koroleva won the bronze medal in the women's 3 m synchro springboard event at the 2020 European Aquatics Championships held in Budapest, Hungary.

References

External links 
 

Living people
2002 births
Place of birth missing (living people)
Russian female divers
Divers at the 2018 Summer Youth Olympics